The Valdosta Metropolitan Statistical Area, as defined by the United States Census Bureau, is an area consisting of four counties – Brooks, Echols, Lanier, and Lowndes – in south-central Georgia, anchored by the city of Valdosta.  As of the United States Census of 2021, the MSA had a population of 149,152.

Counties
Brooks
Echols
Lanier
Lowndes

Communities
Places with more than 50,000 inhabitants
Valdosta (Principal city)
Places with 1,000 to 5,000 inhabitants
Lakeland
Quitman
Hahira
Places with fewer than 1,000 inhabitants
Barwick (partial)
Dasher
Lake Park
Moody AFB (census-designated place)
Morven
Pavo (partial)
Remerton
Unincorporated places
Barney
Clyattville
Dixie
Grooverville
Mineola
Naylor
Statenville
Stockton

Transportation

Highways
There are many signed highways in the area:
 Interstate 75
 U.S. Route 41 (North Valdosta Road) (co-signed with I-75 between Exits 22 and 60)
  U.S. Route 84 (Hill Avenue (Valdosta), Wiregrass Parkway)
 U.S. Route 129
 U.S. Route 221 (co-signed with US 84)
 U.S. Route 441
 State Route 7 (co-signed with US 41)(Used to be Ashley St(NB)and Patterson St(SB), now they are ALT SR7)
 State Route 11
 State Route 31
 State Route 37
 State Route 64
 State Route 76
 State Route 89
 State Route 94
 State Route 122 (Main Street (Hahira, Lakeland))
 State Route 125 (Bemiss Road (Lowndes County))
 State Route 133 (Billy Langdale Parkway, St. Augustine Road (Valdosta))
 State Route 135 
 State Route 187
 State Route 333 (Moultrie Road (Brooks County))
 State Route 376

Airports
There are two airports in the area:
Quitman Brooks County Airport (4J5) (General aviation)
Valdosta Regional Airport (VLD, KVLD) (Commercial service to Hartsfield-Jackson Atlanta International Airport)

Demographics
As of the census of 2000, there were 119,560 people, 42,666 households, and 29,474 families residing in the MSA. The racial makeup of the MSA was 62.42% White, 33.37% African American, 0.40% Native American, 0.98% Asian, 0.04% Pacific Islander, 1.54% from other races, and 1.25% from two or more races. Hispanic or Latino of any race were 3.19% of the population.

The median income for a household in the MSA was $28,516, and the median income for a family was $34,044. Males had a median income of $26,347 versus $19,250 for females. The per capita income for the MSA was $15,019.

See also

Georgia statistical areas
List of municipalities in Georgia (U.S. state)

References

 
Geography of Brooks County, Georgia
Geography of Echols County, Georgia
Geography of Lanier County, Georgia
Geography of Lowndes County, Georgia
Metropolitan areas of Georgia (U.S. state)
Regions of Georgia (U.S. state)